Wakefield is a city in Dixon and Wayne Counties in the State of Nebraska. The population was 1,451 at the 2010 census.

The Dixon County portion of Wakefield is part of the Sioux City, IA–NE–SD Metropolitan Statistical Area.

History
Wakefield got its start in the year 1881, following construction of the Chicago, St. Paul, Minneapolis and Omaha Railway through the territory. It was named for L. W. Wakefield, a railroad engineer. Wakefield was incorporated in 1883.

Geography
Wakefield is located at  (42.267553, -96.867378).

Climate

Demographics

2010 census
As of the census of 2010, there were 1,451 people, 534 households, and 352 families living in the city. The racial makeup of the city was 75.6% White, 0.4% African American, 0.5% Native American, 0.5% Asian, 0.1% Pacific Islander, 21.4% from other races, and 1.5% from two or more races. Hispanic or Latino of any race were 33.6% of the population.

There were 534 households, of which 32.4% had children under the age of 18 living with them, 51.7% were married couples living together, 9.6% had a female householder with no husband present, 4.7% had a male householder with no wife present, and 34.1% were non-families. 30.0% of all households were made up of individuals, and 17.2% had someone living alone who was 65 years of age or older. The average household size was 2.64 and the average family size was 3.23.

The median age in the city was 38 years. 25.7% of residents were under the age of 18; 9.7% were between the ages of 18 and 24; 22.8% were from 25 to 44; 23.1% were from 45 to 64; and 18.5% were 65 years of age or older. The gender makeup of the city was 47.6% male and 52.4% female.

2000 census
As of the census of 2000, there were 1,411 people, 522 households, and 346 families living in the city. The racial makeup of the city was 83.63% White, 1.13% Native American, 0.43% Asian, 13.68% from other races, and 1.13% from two or more races. Hispanic or Latino of any race were 17.43% of the population.

There were 522 households, out of which 32.4% had children under the age of 18 living with them, 54.0% were married couples living together, 9.4% had a female householder with no husband present, and 33.7% were non-families. 30.7% of all households were made up of individuals, and 19.9% had someone living alone who was 65 years of age or older. The average household size was 2.59 and the average family size was 3.25.

In the city, the population was spread out, with 27.2% under the age of 18, 8.1% from 18 to 24, 24.9% from 25 to 44, 18.3% from 45 to 64, and 21.5% who were 65 years of age or older. The median age was 38 years. For every 100 females, there were 88.9 males. For every 100 females age 18 and over, there were 85.0 males.

As of 2000 the median income for a household in the city was $32,308, and the median income for a family was $41,429. Males had a median income of $26,607 versus $20,789 for females. The per capita income for the city was $15,830. About 5.6% of families and 7.2% of the population were below the poverty line, including 7.8% of those under age 18 and 9.4% of those age 65 or over.

Economy
The largest employer in Wakefield is the Michael Foods egg-processing plant, with 800 employees.  Other major employers include Wakefield Health Care Center, a nursing home with 65 employees; Wakefield Public School, with 55 employees; Central Valley Ag, a supplier of fertilizer and farm supplies, with 20 employees; and Roses Transport, a freight-hauling company with 17 employees.

References

External links
 Wakefield, Nebraska

 

Cities in Dixon County, Nebraska
Cities in Wayne County, Nebraska
Cities in Nebraska
Sioux City metropolitan area
Populated places established in 1881
1881 establishments in Nebraska